In quantum mechanics, especially in the study of open quantum systems, reduced dynamics refers to the time evolution of a density matrix for a system coupled to an environment. Then the reduced dynamics of the system alone is simply

If we assume that the mapping  is linear and completely positive, then the reduced dynamics can be represented by a quantum operation.  This mean we can express it in the operator-sum form

In particular, if the system and environment are initially in a product state , it can be shown that the reduced dynamics are completely positive. However, the most general possible reduced dynamics are not completely positive.

Notes

References
 Nielsen, Michael A. and Isaac L. Chuang (2000).  Quantum Computation and Quantum Information, Cambridge University Press, 

Quantum information science